Limburg (Lahn) station is a station in the city of Limburg an der Lahn in the German state of Hesse. It is on the Lahntal railway, running between Koblenz and Gießen.

Infrastructure

The only section of line that is electrified in the Limburg area is between Limburg freight yard and Eschhofen station. At the west end of Limburg station a two-track branch line branches off towards Staffel, where it separates into two single-track lines to Siershahn (the Lower Westerwald Railway, Westerwaldbahn) and to Au (Sieg) (the Upper Westerwald Railway, Oberwesterwaldbahn). East of Limburg, in Eschhofen, the double track, electrified Main-Lahn Railway (Main-Lahn-Bahn) branches off to the southeast towards Frankfurt and Wiesbaden (via the Ländches Railway (Ländchesbahn).

Until 2005, there was also a Deutsche Bahn maintenance depot at the station, which is now closed and was formerly partly leased to the private rail operator, vectus Verkehrsgesellschaft mbH, which has been taken over by Hessische Landesbahn. Most of the former site was converted into a shopping centre. Vectus Verkehrsgesellschaft mbH also had its headquarters there until 2014. The registered office of Hessische Landesbahn is now in an adjoining building of WERKStadt Limburg. A two-track hall is used for the maintenance and maintenance of traction units. The electrified sidings are used by Deutsche Bahn. All non-electrified sidings are used by both DB and HLB. A former freight line and some points were dismantled to create more space for parking spaces used by employees of the surrounding companies.

Train services

The following services currently call at Limburg:

Connections with Limburg Süd station
During the construction of the Cologne–Frankfurt high-speed railway, it was decided not to establish a rail link between Limburg (Lahn) station and Limburg Süd station. Buses that stop at the bus station on the south side of the station connect the two stations together and are free for travelers with train tickets to either station.

References

Railway stations in Hesse
Railway stations in Germany opened in 1862
Buildings and structures in Limburg-Weilburg